Club Universidad Nacional, A.C., commonly referred to as Pumas and UNAM, is a professional football club based in Ciudad Universitaria of Mexico City, Mexico. The club competes in the Liga MX, the top division in the Mexican football league system. Founded in 1954, they play their home games at Estadio Olímpico Universitario.

Domestically, Pumas UNAM has won 11 trophies: 7 Liga MX, 1 Copa MX, the Campeón de Campeones twice, as well as 1 Segunda División de México. In international club football, the club has won 3 CONCACAF Champions Cups and 1 Copa Interamericana. The club has a long-standing rivalry with Club América in the derbi capitalino.

The club is one of the most popular clubs in Mexico. It is considered to be one of the Cuatro Grandes of Mexican football, alongside Cruz Azul, Guadalajara, and Club América.

The team is also known for its youth development system, which has produced international players such as Hugo Sánchez, Manuel Negrete, Luis Flores, Miguel España, Claudio Suárez, Luis García, Alberto García Aspe, David Patiño, Jorge Campos, Braulio Luna, Gerardo Torrado,
 Francisco Fonseca,
Efraín Juárez, Héctor Moreno, Pablo Barrera, Israel Castro, Eduardo Herrera and Jesús Gallardo.

Los Pumas
Club Universidad Nacional (Pumas UNAM) was originally an amateur club of college students from UNAM's several schools and then developed into a professional team competing in the Mexican football league. It is now one of the biggest clubs in all of Mexico. It has evolved into one of the most popular Mexican teams and has gained an international following.

The team's blue and gold colors were selected as a tribute to the University of Notre Dame, whose football coaches helped to develop an American-style football team at the university. The nickname was inspired by Roberto 'Tapatio' Mendez, who coached the team from 1946 to 1964 and whose motivational speeches often compared his players to pumas. The nickname stayed with the public, and all the athletic teams representing the university have been called Pumas.

Their home ground is the Estadio Olímpico Universitario, the main venue of the 1968 Summer Olympics. It has a seating capacity of over 72,000. The stadium is situated within the campus which enables easy access by the students. The Pumas have training facilities within the campus but their main complex is the Cantera, located nearby.

History
The dean of the university, Luis Chico Goerne, made the first attempt to affiliate a representative of UNAM with the top football Mexican championship of the day, filing a petition to join the Liga Mayor de Fútbol Professional del Distrito Federal. The petition was rejected in favor of  de Morelos. Therefore, Pumas played 13 years in Mexicos Liga De Ascenso.

By the 1940s, the dean Gustavo Baz Prada assigned the task to prepare the UNAM team to Rodolfo "Butch" Muñoz, then player of Club España. The new manager formed its new team with members of the student body of the many schools and faculties of the university. The UNAM team joined many university tournaments, with successful results, and "Butch" Muñoz went on to manage the team for 13 years. This prepared the team to complete its later transition to professional status.

Establishment: 1950s
In August 1954, the Club Universidad was accepted as a member of the Segunda División, in those days the second tier division of professional football in Mexico. This achievement was accomplished with the support of the dean Nabor Carrillo and Guillermo Aguilar Alvarez Sr., a benefactor of the club. Aguilar Alvarez was appointed by the dean as the chairman of the club.

On September 12, 1954 UNAM played its first professional game, an away match against Monterrey. After competing for three years, Club Universidad requested a one-year moratorium in its competing in Segunda División play to undergo a programme rebuilding process. Within that year, Hector Ortiz was appointed as the new manager of the club, and a Board of Patrons was formed.

The promotion: 1960s
Pumas UNAM realized its objective of promotion from Segunda División to Primera División when Club Universidad won the home-played promotion match on January 9, 1962, by defeating Club Cataluña de Torreón, 9–1. The match ended, the students rushed the pitch, and honored its team by carrying them off the field on their shoulders—this was the first step towards the consolidation of the club.

The following day, dean Ignacio Chávez Sánchez congratulated the team when he met with them: Octavio Vial (manager), and players: Homero Villar, Raúl Chanes, José Antonio "La Espátula" Rodríguez, Rafael Ramirez Jimenez, Alfredo Echávarri, José Ruiz, Carlos Gutierrez, Alfredo "Tito" Zenteno, José Luis "El Chango" Ledezma, Antonio Sámano, Jorge Gaitán, Guillermo Vázquez Sr., José Luis González "La Calaca", Lorenzo Garcia, Carlos Calderón de la Barca, Manuel "Manolo" Rodríguez, Edmundo "El Poli" Pérez, and Gustavo "El Gato" Cuenca.

The team established itself in the Primera División, the Board of Patrons prepared for the continuation of the team's success by establishing youth system to develop new players.

The legend begins: 1970s

After two years under the management of Alfonso "El Pescado" Portugal, the Spaniard Ángel Zubieta took the reins of the team. This enabled the program to identify "foreign" reinforcements, but rely on promoting from the youth system.

The first half of the decade was marked by the arrival of three of the most important foreign players in the existence of the club; the Peruvian Juan José Muñante, the Serbian Velibor "Bora" Milutinović, and the Brazilian Cabinho. They arrived to join a solid base of native-players such as Miguel Mejía Barón, Héctor Sanabria, Arturo Vázquez Ayala, José Luis "Pareja" López, and Leonardo Cuellar. In the second half of the decade those same players would give the club its first titles in the top division.

In 1975 the club adopted a new administration consisting of an independent civil association that helped the university to support the club. In the 1974–75 season, Universidad won the Copa México and the Campeón de Campeones. In the 1976–77 season, Club Universidad became league champion for the first time in its history. That championship was followed by two sub championships. The culmination of a successful decade for Club Universidad came with the debut of Hugo Sánchez. In 1978, Club Universidad would signed Ricardo "Tuca" Ferretti , a player that will prove to be vital for the team in the coming decade.

Consolidation: 1980s
In the 1980–81 season, Universidad won its second league championship. That season was also the last season Hugo Sánchez played for the club. In the following season, the Pumas won the CONCACAF Championship and the Interamerican Cup.

This decade also marked the national recognition of the work performed by the club, and the revolutionary and dynamic style of play that helped Mexican football overall. For the 1986 FIFA World Cup, the Mexican Football Federation appointed the manager of Universidad, Velibor "Bora" Milutinović as the manager of the Mexico national football team. Milutinović called numerous Pumas and former Pumas to the nation team, including Hugo Sánchez, Félix Cruz Barbosa, Rafael Amador, Raúl Servín, Miguel España, Manuel Negrete and Luis Flores. This generation of players gave great satisfactions not only to the followers of Pumas, but also to the Mexican football fans.

Ups and downs: 1990s
The decade began with one of the most celebrated championships in club history, the 1990–91 League Championship against arch-rivals Club América - the memorable winning goal via free kick from Ricardo "Tuca" Ferretti. This will be the last game of Ricardo "Tuca" Ferretti due to retirement as a professional player. A new generation of players arrived, including Luis García, Jorge Campos, Claudio Suárez, Antonio Sancho, Israel López, Braulio Luna, Rafael García, Jaime Lozano, and Gerardo Torrado. This decade is, however, considered one of the least successful in terms of championships and development of players. Towards the end of the decade, Hugo Sánchez became manager of the club for the first time.

Success: 2000s
In 2004, Sánchez led the Pumas to their first championship in thirteen years. The Pumas were able to retain the championship later that year, becoming the first team since the Mexican league was split into two seasons to win back-to-back championships. As of summer 2012, they remain the only team to achieve this feat. Along with two domestic titles, the Pumas were also able to win both the Campeon de Campeones.

In 2005, the Pumas reached the Copa Sudamericana final, where they lost to Boca Juniors in a penalty shoot out when Roberto Abbondanzieri controversially stopped a penalty after having been forgiven a red card for handling the ball outside the penalty box denying a Pumas player a clear chance on goal. Domestically, the Pumas struggled after their 2004 success and, by 2006, were facing the threat of relegation. Ricardo Ferretti was appointed as manager that year in an effort to lead Pumas away from the relegation zone. The stability and discipline that Ferretti brought to the team paid off as the Pumas climbed out of the relegation zone and reached a final in 2007 against Atlante, which they lost 2–1 on aggregate. In 2009, Ferretti once again led the Pumas to a final, this time being victorious against Pachuca in extra time to claim the team's sixth championship.

Rejuvenating the Club: 2010s

In 2011, Pumas became champions of Clausura 2011 tournament, winning their seventh championship against Monarcas Morelia.

After hard times at the club after the sacking of Guillermo Vasquez as head coach in 2012, he was re-hired as head coach in 2014. In Apertura 2015, Pumas made it to the tournament final against Tigres U.A.N.L. Tigres won the first leg of the Final with a home win of 3–0. Then in the second leg of the final Pumas managed to tie the game on the global scoreboard at home 4–1. A penalty-shootout had to be done and Tigres won the championship 4–2 at a penalty-shootout. Thus, making Pumas unable to gain its 8th title. After the club's inability to make it to the play-offs in Clausura 2016 and failing to reach the semifinal for Copa Libertadores 2016 Guillermo Vasquez was once again sacked as head coach in May 2016.

At the end of May 2016, Pumas hired Francisco Palencia as head coach making Palencia debut as his first team to manage. Once again, in Apertura 2016 Pumas made it to the play-offs against Tigres for quarter finals. In the first leg with Pumas hosting the home game both teams tied 2-2. In the second leg Tigres hosting the home game, Tigres won 5–0. Thus, in the global scoreboard Pumas lost 7–2, and was not able to go further throughout the play-off stage.

In the Clausura 2017, Pumas had signed the Chilean forward Nicolas Castillo in order to give more ability in the offensive part of the team. He conceived 8 goals the first 2 months of the season before he was injured and was out for the rest of the season. Pumas was having a great streak of games the first half of the season. Starting gaming Game 14 they lost 4 straight games and were not able to score a goal. With these results they finished in 17th place and were the worst defensive team having 30 goals against and Nicolas Castillo missing his top scorer championship by 1 goal by Raul Ruidiaz, player of Monarcas Morelia who made 9 goals.

In the Apertura 2017, many key players were sold or loaned out the loan, such as Alejandro Palacios, and long time captain Dario Veron, all with the purpose to make room for new, young players.

Rivalries

Universidad has strong rivalries with Club América and Cruz Azul. These games are passionate and followed by the whole city. There is also a more recent rivalry with Guadalajara.

Clásico Capitalino

The rivalry with Club América, compared to the others, is quite old and began during the 1960s, when Universidad won its promotion. The mere fact that both clubs are located in Mexico City generated the right atmosphere to see a rivalry born and grow. A few years later Club América bought Pumas UNAM idol Enrique Borja, even though the player had made a public statement that he did not want to be sold to Club América. In the 1980s the rivalry grew when Club América defeated Universidad twice in the league finals, both times with controversial refereeing decisions. The 1990s began with a "victory" of the Pumas over their rivals in the league finals, although it was actually a tie; the first leg was lost 3–2, and only the second leg was a 1–0 win. The aggregate score was 3–3, but Pumas UNAM scored two goals as the visiting team, giving them the edge. A new generation of players from the youth system grew up hating their adversaries; this decade is also marked by the birth of Las Barras Bravas, who supported both sides but had a much longer background story of rivalry. This rivalry is often referred to as the most violent of Mexico, with security measures exceeding those of any other game.

Pumas UNAM vs. Cruz Azul
The rivalry with Cruz Azul comes out of the fact that both clubs are located in Mexico City, and they have played many important matches, including two league finals, recently the name of this game is the "Clásico Metropolitano or Derby  central" because both teams was born in states that are in the centre of Mexico

Clásico Universitario
The only major encounter these two clubs have had with each other was in the 1977 final. Pumas UNAM beat Leones Negros to achieve their first title.

Pumas UNAM vs. Guadalajara
In recent years, Pumas and Guadalajara have increased their rivalry. Most of it is due to the 2004 Final; Pumas vs Guadalajara. Also Pumas UNAM went 36 years without winning an away match against Guadalajara. Many people have started calling this fixture a clasico.

On October 6, 2018, Pumas faced Guadalajara away in Liga MX. They had won this fixture ten days earlier in the Copa MX Round of 16 by a score of 3–1, though many considered the winless streak still unbroken because it did not occur in Liga MX play. Guadalajara quickly took the lead, Isaác Brizuela opening the scoring. However Guadalajara had little time to celebrate, as Pumas tied the game shortly thereafter. The score remained 1-1 until the 66th minute, when Felipe Mora scored on a header to give Pumas the lead. Pumas then saw out the 2–1 win, officially ending the 36-year record of not winning against Guadalajara in an away match in the Liga MX.

Historic badges

Past kits
First kit evolution

Honours

Friendly tournaments

 Pentagonal "Lic. Juan Fernández Albarrán": 1969.
 Torneo Cuadrangular de agosto : 1971.
 Copa Coors California: 1985.
 Copa Pachuca (1): 1994.
 Copa Universidades de América : 2000.
 Copa Dallas : 2001.
 Trofeo Santiago Bernabéu (1): 2004.
 Copa Chiapas (1): 2008.
 Torneo Club International: 2012.
 Trofeo Reto del Sol: 2012.
 Torneo Cotton Bowl (Detroit, EEUU): 2012.
 Copa Feria de León (1): 2017.
 Copa Rudo Rivera [Atlante] (1): 2021.
Best games (national):
National 9–0 vs UAG May 16, 1976
Apertura 2007: 8–0 vs Veracruz
Apertura 2002: 7–1 vs Guadalajara

Best games (international):
Best International score: 8–0 vs  Isidro Metapán March 2008
CONCACAF Champions League: 6–1 vs  Marathón March 2010.
CONCACAF Champions League: 8-1 vs  W Connection October 20, 2016

Best position in the League Table: 1
Worst position in the League Table: 19th (last) during winter 2001

Club officials

Management

Coaching staff

Players

First-team squad

Out on loan

Reserves and Academy

Pumas Tabasco
Reserve team that plays in the Liga de Expansión in the second level of the Mexican league system.

World Cup players
The following players have represented their country at the World Cup whilst playing for Pumas UNAM:

  Aarón Padilla (1966, 1970)
  Luis Regueiro (1966)
  Elías Muñoz (1966)
  Enrique Borja (1966, 1970)
  José Luis González (1970)
  Mario Velarde (1970)
  Francisco Castrejón (1970)
  Arturo Vázquez Ayala (1978)
  Enrique López Zarza (1978)
  Hugo Sánchez (1978)
  Leonardo Cuéllar (1978)
  Juan José Muñante (1978)
  Miguel España (1986)
  Félix Cruz (1986)
  Luis Flores (1986)
  Raúl Servín (1986)
  Rafael Amador (1986)
  Manuel Negrete (1986)
  Jorge Campos (1994, 1998, 2002)
  Claudio Suárez (1994, 1998, 2006)
  Juan de Dios Ramírez Perales (1994)
  Braulio Luna (1998, 2002)
  Pablo Barrera (2010)
  Israel Castro (2010)
  Efraín Juárez (2010)
  Darío Verón (2010)
  Jesús Gallardo (2018)
  Dani Alves (2022)

Managers

 Rodolfo Muñoz "Butch" (Sep. 1954–Mar. 1955)
 Donato Alonso (Apr. 1955–1956)
 Héctor Ortiz Benítez (1958-1960)
 Octavio Vial (Sep. 1960–Aug. 62)
 Luiz Carlos "Carlito" Peters (Aug. 1962) (interim)
 Renato Cesarini (Aug. 1962–Dec. 1965)
 Ángel Papadópulos Ruiz (Jan. 1965–1966)
 Diego Mercado Marín (1966–67)
 Walter Ormeño (1967–68)
 Árpád Fekete (1968–69)
 Ángel Zubieta (1970–74)
 Luiz Carlos "Carlito" Peters (Jul.–Dec.1974)
 Carlos Iturralde Rivero (Jan.–Apr. 1975)
 Árpád Fekete (Apr. 1975–76)
 Jorge Marik (1976–77)
 Velibor "Bora" Milutinović (1977–Dec. 1982)
 Mario Velarde (Jan. 1983–Jun. 1987)
 Héctor Sanabria (Jun. 1987–Jun. 1988)
 Miguel Mejía Barón (Jul. 1988–91)
 Ricardo Ferretti (1991–96)
 Pablo Luna (Jun.–Sep. 1996)
 Luis Flores (Sep. 1996–97)
 Enrique López Zarza (1997–98)
 Roberto Saporiti (1998–99)
 Rafael Amador (1999–00)
 Hugo Sánchez (2000)
 Miguel Mejía Barón (2001)
 Hugo Sánchez (2001–05)
 Miguel España (2005–06)
 Guillermo Vázquez (2006)
 Ricardo Ferretti (2006–10)
 Guillermo Vázquez (2010–12)
 Joaquín del Olmo (2012)
 Juan Antonio Torres (2012)
 Mario Carrillo (2012)
 Juan Antonio Torres (2012–13)
 José Luis Trejo (2013–14)
 Guillermo Vázquez (2014–16)
 Francisco Palencia (2016–17)
 Sergio Egea (2017)
 David Patiño (2017–19)
 Bruno Marioni (2019)
 Míchel (2019–20)
 Andrés Lillini (2020–2022)
 Rafael Puente Jr. (2022–2023)

References

Guadalajara Chivas - U.N.A.M.- Pumas 1:3
Guadalajara Chivas - U.N.A.M.- Pumas 1:2

External links
 
 

 
Association football clubs established in 1954
Football clubs in Mexico City
National Autonomous University of Mexico athletics
University and college association football clubs
Liga MX teams
1954 establishments in Mexico
U
U